Time After Time is the nineteenth studio album by Etta James, released in 1995. The album reached a peak position of number five on Billboard Top Jazz Albums chart.

Reception

In a review for AllMusic, Steve Leggett wrote: "James elegantly delivers her versions of vocal jazz standards... It's all graceful and uptown, and James' singing is hauntingly beautiful."

Allen Howie of Louisville Music News stated: "What's clear is that James has lived with these songs... James brings an earthy elegance to the dozen tunes appearing here. With impeccable arrangements by Walton and a delightfully diverse song selection, Time After Time leaves James' stamp on jazz while proving yet again that her muse is as eclectic as it is enduring."

Track listing

References

1995 albums
Etta James albums